
Gmina Sompolno is an urban-rural gmina (administrative district) in Konin County, Greater Poland Voivodeship, in west-central Poland.

Villages
Apart from the town of Sompolno, Gmina Sompolno contains the villages and settlements of Bagno, Belny, Biele, Błonawy, Bronisława, Czamża, Dąbrowa, Grądy, Janowice, Jaźwiny, Jesionka, Kazubek, Klonowa, Kolonia Lipiny, Kolonia Wierzbie, Koszary, Łagiewniki, Lubstów, Lubstówek, Mąkolno, Marcinkowo, Marcjanki, Marianowo, Młynek, Mostki, Nadjezioro, Nowa Wieś, Olszewo, Ośno Dolne, Ośno Górne, Ośno Podleśne, Ostrówek, Paprocin, Piaski, Płoszewo, Police, Przystronie, Racięcice, Radowo, Romanowo, Ryn, Siedliska, Smolarnia, Smólniki Mostkowskie, Sompolinek, Spólnik, Stefanowo, Suszewy, Sycewo, Szczerkowo, Wierzbie, Wroczewo, Wymysłowo, Zakrzewek, Zdrojki and Zofia.

Neighbouring gminas
Gmina Sompolno is bordered by the gminas of Babiak, Kramsk, Osiek Mały, Ślesin and Wierzbinek.

Lakes
 Jezioro Lubstowskie, 87,2 ha, depth 7,0 m
 Mąkolno (Mąkoleńskie), 84 ha
 Mostki, 28 ha
 Szczekawa, 17 ha

References

Polish official population figures 2006

Sompolno
Konin County